Mahagathbandhan, also known as Grand Alliance, is a coalition of political parties in the state of Jharkhand in India, formed before the 2019 Lok Sabha Elections.

The alliance consists of Jharkhand Mukti Morcha, Indian National Congress, Rashtriya Janata Dal, Nationalist Congress Party.

History

2018
To fight the incumbent BJP government in the state and in national level the four major state party JMM, Congress, JVM(P), RJD joined hands to form a united opposition in the state under the leadership of JMM in state election and INC in national election. They named it as Mahagathbandhan.

2019 Lok Sabha elections
Jharkhand Mukti Morcha, Congress, Jharkhand Vikas Morcha (P), Rashtriya Janata Dal fought the Lok Sabha Elections In 2019 under the banner of UPA/MGB And Contested The Elections For 14 Seats in Jharkhand. Congress On 7 Seats, Jharkhand Mukti Morcha On 4 Seats, Jharkhand Vikas Morcha (P) On 2 Seats, Rashtriya Janata Dal On 1 Seat. The results were Announced on 23 May 2019 The Congress Won From Singhbhum Seat And Jharkhand Mukti Morcha Won From Rajmahal Seat.
After The Elections Jharkhand Vikas Morcha (P) Left The Alliance

2019 Jharkhand Assembly election

In Jharkhand Assembly Election Jharkhand Mukti Morcha Contesting On 43 Seats, Congress Contesting On 31 Seats, Rashtriya Janata Dal Contesting On 7 Seats

After the defeat of the incumbent BJP government, incumbent Chief Minister Raghubar Das tendered his resignation from the post. He tendered his resignation to Governor Draupadi Murmu.

In the evening, during the election results, JMM leader and Former Chief Minister of Jharkhand Hemant Soren addressed the media and thanked the people of Jharkhand for the mandate. He also expressed his gratitude to his alliance partners, Congress & RJD and their president, Sonia Gandhi & Lalu Prasad Yadav respectively.

Next day on 24 December 2019, the meeting of all the 30 JMM MLAs was called, in which Hemant Soren was elected as the leader of the JMM legislature group. Hemant Soren was already the leader and Chief Ministerial candidate of the UPA during the election campaign. On the very same day, Alamgir Alam was elected as the leader of the Congress in the Assembly

After the elections, JVM(P) chief and Former Chief Minister of Jharkhand Babulal Marandi extended the support of his party to the Hemant Soren government, thus providing more strength to the government.

On 24 December 2019, Hemant Soren along with the alliance partners, met Governor Draupadi Murmu and staked claim to form the government.Thus the Mahagathbandhan government came into existence in the Jharkhand.

Current members

See also
 Mahagathbandhan (Bihar)
 Mahagathbandhan (Uttar Pradesh)
 Maha Vikas Aghadi (Maharashtra)

References

Political party alliances in India